Billy Dedman (10 September 1854 – 24 July 1920) was an Australian rules footballer for  in the pre-VFA era and for South Adelaide and Norwood in the SAFA.

In 1876, whilst playing for Carlton, he kicked 18 goals across all matches, the most in the colony of Victoria for the year.

References

Norwood Football Club players
South Adelaide Football Club players
Carlton Football Club (VFA) players
Australian rules footballers from Victoria (Australia)
1920 deaths
1854 births